is a Japanese anime series based on a novel by Takashi Shōji. It consists of two 3-episode OVA sets and a 26-episode television series animated by J.C.Staff and directed by Akiyuki Shinbo. The series was released in the United States by The Right Stuf International on DVD in 2003.

Synopsis
The series is set in 2999 AD, where two factions—TERRA and NESS—are engaged in a space war game to control planets. They fight with spaceships, which have been made to teleport their pilots back to the mother ship upon destruction. This results in the battles having no true casualties. Since the reflexes of people in the 30th century have greatly deteriorated, a TERRA engineer, Curtis Lawson, uses a time machine to go back 1000 years in time. There, he recruits four girls to fight for TERRA.

Characters
:
Yohko is an active, sporty but cocky girl. She is a hardcore gamer, preferring space fight simulations, and is occasionally bribed using games. She pilots the Super Strike TA-29, armed with the all-powerful Everblack Cannon. Due to her obsession with games, she is required to put in a 100-yen coin into an arcade-like coin slot to start her starship.

:
Momiji is the second of TERRA's pilots. A long-haired, somewhat masculine girl, she speaks in the kansai dialect. She's strong willed and a team player. She works part-time at a mini-market. She has a crush on Lawson, and for a short period believed that Yohko was attracted to him. She is the pilot of the Super Storm TA-23, armed with MRLs and Laser Arrays.

:
Yohko's best friend, Yohko trusts her and believes that Ayano's abilities would outmatch her own in the right circumstances. She's generally quiet and she truly cares and admires Yohko since childhood. She lives with her grandfather, the Master of the Hakuhouin-Ryū Judo Family.

:
She is the main comic relief of the series. She considers herself Yohko's rival, and strives to beat Yohko in all aspects, such as in sports, studies, and even gaming. Her efforts can be observed when she aspires to become a starship pilot, and her diligence in overcoming vertigo. She is very poised but kind of spoiled and happy-go-lucky.
Admiral Zena Leon
The highest-ranking officer on board the Estanatreich. She was once a TERRA pilot, but was promoted to command. She once fought in a battle with Fluger known as Little Big Horn. She pilots the Super Twister TA-21 in the Zenga tournament, partnered with Fluger.

Curtis Lawson
A genius engineer. He worked on the time travel machine that is used as the gateway between 1999 AD and 2999 AD.
General Fluger von Meo-Toroll
The commander of Meo's 2nd Fleet, in charge of the Red Snappers—the aces of NESS. He is often represented riding on a white horse, which gives him the image of a knight. He is a capable leader, admired by Rouge and Yohko. Like Admiral Leon, he was also a former starship pilot who had been elevated in rank.

A clone of Yohko, created by Zenga using the Old Timer's Inheritance. Although biologically a girl, Zenga seems to have brought Yohsuke up to be a man. She first appears in the series as a young child, to observe Yohko's life. Later Yohsuke appears in the series in the guise of a man, and joins Madoka's class on the last day of school.

TV episodes

External links
 
 Animerica review

1996 anime OVAs
1997 anime OVAs
1999 anime television series debuts
1999 Japanese television series endings
Fiction set in the 30th century
J.C.Staff
TV Tokyo original programming